Lisjaki is a small village next to Spodnja Branica in the Littoral region of Slovenia. It lies within the Municipality of Komen.

References

External links

Lisjaki on Geopedia

Populated places in the Municipality of Komen